ʻAlipate Tuʻivanuavou Vaea, Lord Vaea (born September 19, 1957) is a Tongan politician and a member of the Tongan nobility. He has served as Master of the Royal Household and "long-time palace archivist", as well as being Chairman of the Tonga Traditions Committee.

He was bestowed the title of 16th Lord Vaea and 2nd Baron Vaea of Houma upon the death of his father, ʻAlipate Halakilangi Tau'alupeoko Vaea Tupou, the previous Vaea, on 7 June 2009. His mother is Baroness Tuputupu Vaea. Vaea is the brother of the present Queen of Tonga Nanasipauʻu Tukuʻaho and the brother-in-law (and second cousin) of King Tupou VI.

This enabled him to rank among the small number of nobles entitled to elect and be elected among, the Nobles' Representatives to Parliament. Thus he began his career in national politics when he was elected to Parliament as a Nobles' Representative for Tongatapu in the November 2010 general election. He was then appointed Minister for Agriculture, Food, Forests and Fisheries in the Cabinet of new Prime Minister Lord Tuʻivakanō. On 1 May 2012, he received, in addition, the Training, Employment, Youth and Sports portfolio.

Tuʻivanuavou was re-elected as a noble's representative in the 2014 Tongan general election, and became the unofficial leader of the opposition. In August 2016 Tuʻivanuavou repeatedly promised to bring a no confidence motion against Prime Minister ʻAkilisi Pōhiva, but ultimately failed to do so. A later attempt in early 2017 was defeated, 10 votes to 14.

He sought re-election at the 2017 Tongan general election, but tied the vote with Lord Vaha'i and lost the subsequent coin-toss. He was re-elected at the 2021 election. On 1 September 2022 he was appointed Minister of Internal Affairs, replacing Sangster Saulala, whose election had been voided for bribery.

Patronages 
 Former Tonga Rugby Union Chairman.
 Former Pacific Islands Rugby Alliance Chairman.

Ancestry

References

1957 births
Members of the Legislative Assembly of Tonga
Agriculture ministers of Tonga
Fisheries ministers of Tonga
Forestry ministers of Tonga
Interior ministers of Tonga
Sports ministers of Tonga
Youth ministers of Tonga
Tongan nobles
Living people
University of Auckland alumni
Massey University alumni
People educated at St Faith's School
People educated at The Leys School